Furtados Music is a retail music store headquartered in Mumbai, India. The first store was established in 1865. Today, Furtados Music has outlets in Ahmedabad, Bengaluru, Mangaluru, Chandigarh, Delhi, Saket, Panjim, Margao, Pune & Mumbai. Furtados Music is the largest retailer of musical instruments in India. The company stocks music instruments of various international brands including Steinway & Sons, Essex, Boston, Pearl River, Yamaha, Ritmüller, Korg, Casio, Gibson, Faith, Epiphone, PRS, Granada, Hobner, Java, Pearl, Mapex, Evans, D’Addario, Zildjian, Sabian, Vox, König & Meyer, JBL, Levy’s, Hercules, Roland and many more.

External links
Official Website of Furtados Music
Growth of Furtados Music
Furtados Music School secures funding of Rs 20 crore

Retail companies established in 1865
Companies based in Mumbai
Music companies of India
Musical instrument retailers
Companies based in Goa
Indian companies established in 1865